Gennaro Sabatino (born 1 January 1993) is an Italian motorcycle racer. He currently races in the CIV Supersport 600 Championship aboard a Kawasaki ZX-6R.

Career statistics

Grand Prix motorcycle racing

By season

Races by year

External links
 Profile on MotoGP.com
 Profile on WorldSBK.com

Italian motorcycle racers
Living people
1993 births
Sportspeople from the Province of Naples
125cc World Championship riders